Nocardioides litoris is a Gram-positive bacterium from the genus Nocardioides which has been isolated from sediments from the Taean seashore in Korea.

References 

 

litoris
Bacteria described in 2017